KRKO (1380 AM) is a commercial radio station licensed to Everett, Washington. The station broadcasts an oldies-classic hits-sports radio format to the Seattle metropolitan area. The station was established in 1922, and is currently operated by S-R Broadcasting Co., Inc., a locally owned company.

KRKO broadcasts on a regional frequency of 1380 kHz with 50,000 watts, the maximum power for United States AM radio stations. The signal is non-directional during daytime hours, but employs a directional antenna at night, in order to avoid interfering with other stations. KRKO broadcasts using HD Radio technology alongside its analog signal.

KRKO's programming is also carried over a 250 watt FM translator, K237GN, 95.3 MHz in Everett.

Programming
KRKO calls its format "Everett's Greatest Hits" which is heavy on the 1970s, with a splash of the 60s and 80s. The morning show features radio veteran Tim Hunter (formerly of KOMO, KLSY, The Wolf) heard weekdays 6 to 9 a.m.

While a music-based format, KRKO continues to cover local and regional sports in Western Washington State, including high school football and basketball. Live play-by-play affiliations include the Everett AquaSox minor league baseball (Seattle Mariners affiliate), Everett Silvertips (Western Hockey League), NHL Vancouver Canucks and two racing networks, Motor Racing Network (MRN Radio) and Performance Racing Network (PRN Radio).  Two of the local sportscasters are Bill Kusler and Tom Lafferty.

History

From 1912 to 1927 radio communication in the United States was regulated by the Department of Commerce, and originally there were no formal requirements for stations, most of which operated under Amateur and Experimental licenses, making broadcasts intended for the general public. In order to provide a common standard, the department issued a regulation effective December 1, 1921 requiring that broadcasting stations would now have to hold a Limited Commercial license that authorized operation on two designated broadcasting wavelengths: 360 meters (833 kHz) for "entertainment", and 485 meters (619 kHz) for "market and weather reports".

The first Everett broadcasting station authorization was issued on June 12, 1922 to Kinney Brothers & Sipprell for KDZZ, operating on 360 meters. Because there was only the single entertainment wavelength, stations in a given region had to develop timesharing arrangements for broadcasts on the shared 360 meter wavelength.

KFBL

The first license for KRKO's predecessor, KFBL, was issued on August 17, 1922 to the Leese Brothers, also for broadcasting on 360 meters, as Everett's second station. This original KFBL license is posted on a wall at the current station. The KFBL call letters were randomly assigned from an alphabetical roster of available call signs. Otto and Robert Leese started the radio station on the second floor of their auto repair shop on 28th and Rucker in downtown Everett.

In mid-1923, the station was assigned to 1340 kHz. On November 11, 1928, under the provisions of the Federal Radio Commission's General Order 40, KFBL was assigned to 1370 kHz, on a timesharing basis with KVL (later KEEN and KEVR) in Seattle.

KRKO

The Leese brothers transferred control of the station to their engineer, Lee Mudgett, in 1934, who changed the call letters to KRKO. In 1940, KRKO was reported to be the last remaining U.S. station operating with a power of only 50 watts.

A 1940 review by the Federal Communications Commission (FCC) found that, under Mudgett's ownership, KRKO was badly managed and financially unstable. Therefore, it initially denied the station's license renewal and its proposed license assignment to the Everett Broadcasting Company, which was controlled by the Taft family. However, the FCC later relented, and approved both applications.

In March 1941, most stations on 1370 kHz, including KRKO and its timeshare partner KEVR in Seattle, were moved to 1400 kHz, as part of the implementation of the North American Regional Broadcasting Agreement. The next year KRKO was authorized to began fulltime operation, after KEVR moved to 1090 kHz. In 1950, KRKO moved to the station's current frequency of 1380 kHz.

KRKO remained under Taft family ownership until the late 1970s. The Taft's Washington, D.C. attorney, John Marple, operated KRKO with some investors for a few years. In the early 1980s, an Everett area investment group led by a local beer distributor, Niles Fowler, acquired control of the station. Control was transferred back to a member of the Taft family following a sale of the station in 1983, but in 1987 new local investors Art Skotdal and Roy Robinson purchased the KRKO assets and the Skotdal family continues to operate KRKO today.

KRKO began a sports radio format in 2000, featuring programming from Fox Sports Radio.

On September 4, 2009, two of the station's four radio towers were toppled by vandals. A sign left at the scene said the eco-terrorist group Earth Liberation Front was responsible. The station transferred its radio transmission to a backup site and remained on the air at reduced power. KRKO operated from the damaged site at full daytime power and reduced nighttime power until both destroyed towers were replaced on August 16, 2010.

On October 4 and 5, 2014, KRKO was the only radio station in North America broadcasting a 100% digital signal during tests made for NAB Labs, a division of the National Association of Broadcasters. KRKO suspended analog transmissions for eight hours on Saturday and four hours on Sunday for daytime and nighttime tests. KRKO was the fourth commercial AM station in North America to test all-digital daytime transmissions.

On July 9, 2018, KRKO changed format to a blend of oldies and classic hits with much of the live play-by-play sporting events previously heard during the all-sports format.

Translator

Previous Logo

References

External links
"KRKO: Everett's Historic Radio Station" by Peter Blecha, December 6, 2010 (HistoryLink.com)

FCC History Cards for KRKO (covering 1927-1980 as KFBL / KRKO)

HD Radio stations
RKO
Radio stations established in 1922
Classic hits radio stations in the United States
Everett, Washington
Mass media in Snohomish County, Washington
1922 establishments in Washington (state)
Radio stations licensed before 1923 and still broadcasting